The 1967 Oklahoma State Cowboys baseball team represented the Oklahoma State University in the 1967 NCAA University Division baseball season.  The team was coached by Chet Bryan in his 3rd year at Oklahoma State.

The Cowboys won the District V playoff to advance to the College World Series, where they were defeated by the Rider Broncs.

Roster

Schedule 

! style="" | Regular Season
|- valign="top" 

|- align="center" bgcolor="#ffcccc"
| 1 || March 27 || at Houston || Buffalo Stadium • Houston, Texas || 4–5 || 0–1 || –
|- align="center" bgcolor="#ccffcc"
| 2 || March 28 || at Houston || Buffalo Stadium • Houston, Texas || 6–5 || 1–1 || –
|- align="center" bgcolor="#ffcccc"
| 3 || March 29 || at  || Rice Baseball Field • Houston, Texas || 0–7 || 1–2 || –
|- align="center" bgcolor="#ffcccc"
| 4 || March 30 || at  || Unknown • Houston, Texas || 0–18 || 1–3 || –
|- align="center" bgcolor="#ffcccc"
| 5 || March 31 || at Houston || Buffalo Stadium • Houston, Texas || 1–4 || 1–4 || –
|-

|- align="center" bgcolor="#ffcccc"
| 6 || April 7 ||  || Unknown • Stillwater, Oklahoma || 5–6 || 1–5 || 0–1
|- align="center" bgcolor="#ccffcc"
| 7 || April 7 || Missouri || Unknown • Stillwater, Oklahoma || 8–6 || 2–5 || 1–1
|- align="center" bgcolor="#ccffcc"
| 8 || April 8 || Missouri || Unknown • Stillwater, Oklahoma || 8–7 || 3–5 || 2–1
|- align="center" bgcolor="#ccffcc"
| 9 || April 14 || at  || Hoglund Ballpark • Lawrence, Kansas || 3–1 || 4–5 || 3–1
|- align="center" bgcolor="#ccffcc"
| 10 || April 14 || at Kansas || Hoglund Ballpark • Lawrence, Kansas || 3–1 || 5–5 || 4–1
|- align="center" bgcolor="#ccffcc"
| 11 || April 15 || at Kansas || FHoglund Ballpark • Lawrence, Kansas || 1–0 || 6–5 || 5–1
|- align="center" bgcolor="#ccffcc"
| 12 || April 21 ||  || Unknown • Stillwater, Oklahoma || 3–1 || 7–5 || 6–1
|- align="center" bgcolor="#ccffcc"
| 13 || April 21 || Nebraska || Unknown • Stillwater, Oklahoma || 4–1 || 8–5 || 7–1
|- align="center" bgcolor="#ccffcc"
| 14 || April 22 || Nebraska || Unknown • Stillwater, Oklahoma || 3–0 || 9–5 || 8–1
|- align="center" bgcolor="#ccffcc"
| 15 || April 28 || at  || Unknown • Norman, Oklahoma || 4–2 || 10–5 || 9–1
|- align="center" bgcolor="#ccffcc"
| 16 || April 28 || at Oklahoma || Unknown • Norman, Oklahoma || 1–0 || 11–5 || 10–1
|- align="center" bgcolor="#ffcccc"
| 17 || April 29 || at Oklahoma || Unknown • Norman, Oklahoma || 2–3 || 11–6 || 10–2
|-

|- align="center" bgcolor="#ffcccc"
| 18 || May 12 || at  || Unknown • Boulder, Colorado || 1–2 || 11–7 || 10–3
|- align="center" bgcolor="#ccffcc"
| 19 || May 19 ||  || Unknown • Stillwater, Oklahoma || 8–0 || 12–7 || 11–3
|- align="center" bgcolor="#ccffcc"
| 20 || May 19 || Iowa State || Unknown • Stillwater, Oklahoma || 2–0 || 13–7 || 12–3
|-

|-
|-
! style="" | Postseason
|- valign="top"

|- align="center" bgcolor="#ccffcc"
| 21 || May 29 ||  || Unknown • Stillwater, Oklahoma || 4–0 || 14–7 || 12–3
|- align="center" bgcolor="#ffcccc"
| 22 || May 29 || Cincinnati || Unknown • Stillwater, Oklahoma || 2–3 || 14–8 || 12–3
|- align="center" bgcolor="#ccffcc"
| 23 || May 31 || Cincinnati || Unknown • Stillwater, Oklahoma || 1–0 || 15–8 || 12–3
|-

|- align="center" bgcolor="#ffcccc"
| 24 || June 12 || vs Arizona State || Omaha Municipal Stadium • Omaha, Nebraska || 2–7 || 15–9 || 12–3
|- align="center" bgcolor="#ffcccc"
| 25 || June 13 || vs  || Omaha Municipal Stadium • Omaha, Nebraska || 1–3 || 15–10 || 12–3
|-

Awards and honors 
Larry Burchart
 All-Big Eight Conference

Tony Sellari
 First Team All-American American Baseball Coaches Association
 All-Big Eight Conference

Danny Thompson
 All-Big Eight Conference

References 

Oklahoma State Cowboys baseball seasons
Oklahoma State Cowboys baseball
College World Series seasons
Oklahoma State
Big Eight Conference baseball champion seasons